Duo Bujie (Tibetan: སྟོབས་རྒྱལ།; born 16 February 1994) is a Chinese long-distance runner of Tibetan ethnicity, competing primarily in the 5000 metres. He is from Taktse, Lhasa. He represented his country at the 2015 World Championships in Beijing without reaching the final. In 2019, he competed in the men's marathon at the 2019 World Athletics Championships held in Doha, Qatar. He did not finish his race.

International competitions

Personal bests
Outdoor
5000 metres – 13:49.16 (Xi'an 2021)
10,000 metres – 28:26.86 (Tianjin 2017)
Marathon – 2:10:31 (Xuzhou 2019)

References

ARRS profile

Chinese male long-distance runners
Living people
Place of birth missing (living people)
1994 births
World Athletics Championships athletes for China
Athletes (track and field) at the 2014 Asian Games
Athletes (track and field) at the 2018 Asian Games
Asian Games medalists in athletics (track and field)
Asian Games bronze medalists for China
Medalists at the 2018 Asian Games
People from Lhasa
Runners from Tibet
Competitors at the 2019 Summer Universiade
21st-century Chinese people